The Belgian Open was a WTA Tour tennis event held over three different periods during 1987–2002. The competition took place in July during 1987–1989 and 2002, and in May during 1992–1993 and 1999–2001. 2000 and 2001 it was sponsored by Dutch clothing chain Mexx and renamed the Benelux Open. The competition was played on outdoor clay courts.

The tournament was a Tier V event in 1992 and 2001, and a Tier IV event in 1993, 1999, 2000 and 2002.

Only one Belgian woman won the singles event; the then little-known Justine Henin, aged 16 in 1999. However, Sabine Appelmans, Kim Clijsters and Els Callens all won the doubles event.

Location chronology
1987: Knokke
1988-89: Brussels
1992: Waregem
1993: Liège
1999-2001: Antwerp

Past finals

Singles

Doubles

See also
 Diamond Games – women's tournament (2002–2008, 2015)
 Brussels Open – women's tournament (2011–2013)

 
Clay court tennis tournaments
Tennis tournaments in Belgium
WTA Tour
Defunct tennis tournaments in Europe
Defunct sports competitions in Belgium